Mani Chandana is an Indian actress who has appeared in Telugu, Kannada and Tamil language films in the early 2000s. She returned to the film industry in the late 2010s portraying supporting roles.

Career
Mani Chandana appeared in Kannada, Telugu and Tamil language films in the early 2000s. She notably also appeared in an item number in the Mahesh Babu-starrer Nijam (2003). Towards the end of her career as a lead actress, she worked on Shivraj's Tamil film Enakke Enakka, which eventually did not have a theatrical release.

Following a sabbatical away from the film industry after her wedding, Mani Chandana returned in the late 2010s to portray supporting roles in Telugu films such as Ungarala Rambabu (2017) and Achari America Yatra (2018).

Filmography

References

External links 
 

Living people
Actresses in Tamil cinema
Actresses in Kannada cinema
20th-century Indian actresses
21st-century Indian actresses
Indian film actresses
Indian beauty pageant winners
Year of birth missing (living people)